St. Ignatius Loyola College is a private Catholic primary and secondary school, located in the La Plazuela area of Medellín, Antioquia, Colombia. The school was founded by the Society of Jesus in 1885, initially as a boys' school, and now offers a co-educaitonal environment for students from kindergarten through 12th grade. The school moved to the Stadium Area in 1957.

History
San Ignacio opened in 1885 with 200 students, including 30 borders. In 1957 it moved to its present location in the Stadium area. The school went coeducational in 1994.

In 2009, the Deputy Minister of Preschool, Basic, and Secondary Education gave Colegio San Ignacio de Loyola the top award for results of a non-state school in the State examinations.

See also

 Education in Colombia
 List of schools in Colombia
 List of Jesuit schools

References

Jesuit secondary schools in Colombia
Catholic primary schools in Colombia
Educational institutions established in 1885
1885 establishments in Colombia
Education in Antioquia